Doc meets Dorf  is a German television series that premiered on 22 August 2013 on RTL Television.

Plot
Cows, guys and disasters: Inez Bjørg David plays the top surgeon Dr. Fritzi Frühling. As the city dweller loses her job and the boyfriend marries another, an inheritance comes just right: she becomes the owner of an old farm in Kanada. But Kanada is in this case just a dull Kaff in Brandenburg. So Fritzi travels there to sell the farm, but has the bill made without the villagers who have long been looking for a new country doctor. In addition to cows Fritzi meets one or the other handsome man. The choice is next to the nature boy Kai (Steve Windolf) just her ex-boyfriend Falk (Bert Tischendorf), who has settled here as a veterinarian.

See also
List of German television series

References

External links
 

2013 German television series debuts
2013 German television series endings
German-language television shows
RTL (German TV channel) original programming